Round Lake is the last part of a chain of eutrophic prairie lakes connected by the Qu'Appelle River in Saskatchewan, formed by glaciation, 10,000 years ago.

The lake harbours recreational activities including camping, boating, and fishing. Cabins can be rented or bought along the shores of the lake. Camping is provided at Bird's Point Resort and Grimeau Park. Round Lake Dam, an embankment dam was constructed on the east end of the lake in 1941 to control water levels and protect from floods downstream on the Qu'Appelle River. The lake is home to a host of fish species including walleye, yellow perch, northern pike, white sucker, longnose sucker, black bullhead, channel catfish, cisco, mooneye, bigmouth buffalo, burbot, common carp, and rock bass. Contrary to the name, Round Lake is not "round". The source of this name is unknown.

Rock bass are Saskatchewan's only native bass.

Access to the lake is provided by Highway 247. Crooked Lake Provincial Park and Crooked Lake are 20 km west. A vantage point, located north of the lake and highway, provides a view of the lake.

See also
Saskatchewan Water Security Agency
List of dams and reservoirs in Canada
List of lakes of Saskatchewan
Fishing Lakes

References 

Lakes of Saskatchewan
Dams in Saskatchewan